Iago Beceiro Pereiro (born 15 March 1993) is a Spanish footballer who plays for CD Tropezón as a forward.

His career, which he started at Deportivo de La Coruña, was marred by indiscipline problems.

Football career

Deportivo
Beceiro was born in A Coruña, Galicia. After playing for local Deportivo de La Coruña as a youth he started his senior career, going on to compete with the reserves in Segunda División B and Tercera División.

Beceiro made his first-team debut on 19 January 2011, coming on as a second-half substitute for Pablo Álvarez in a 2–3 home loss against UD Almería for the season's Copa del Rey. He spent the remaining of his spell at the club with the B's, however.

Karpaty Lviv
In late January 2013, Beceiro signed a contract with Ukrainian Premier League team FC Karpaty Lviv. He left the after only a few weeks, without making a single appearance.

Back to Spain
In April 2013, Beceiro moved back to his home country and joined Verín CF in the regional leagues. After scoring regularly, he returned to Deportivo and its reserve team in July, but terminated his contract on 29 January 2014.

Beceiro subsequently had unassuming spells at Caudal Deportivo and UD Somozas, before returning to Verín in late 2014. On 20 January 2016 he signed for Segunda División side SD Ponferradina, being immediately loaned to Atlético Astorga FC until the end of the third level campaign.

On 3 August 2016, Beceiro was loaned to CDA Navalcarnero for one year. The following January, his loan was terminated and he moved to CD Barco in the fourth tier, also in a temporary deal.

In July 2017, Beceiro signed with Arosa SC still in his native region and the lower leagues. His contract was ended in January of the following year, due to indiscipline.

References

External links

1993 births
Living people
Spanish footballers
Spanish expatriate footballers
Footballers from A Coruña
Association football forwards
Segunda División B players
Tercera División players
Divisiones Regionales de Fútbol players
Deportivo Fabril players
Deportivo de La Coruña players
Caudal Deportivo footballers
SD Ponferradina players
Atlético Astorga FC players
CDA Navalcarnero players
FC Karpaty Lviv players
CD Tropezón players
Spain youth international footballers
Spanish expatriate sportspeople in Ukraine
Expatriate footballers in Ukraine